Konrad Berkowicz (born 27 May 1984 in Kraków) is a Polish politician and computer scientist. He has been a vice-chairman of KORWiN since 2015. He is a deputy in the Sejm since 2019.

In 2019, he was elected to the Sejm, starting from the Confederation Freedom and Independence list in the Kraków II constituency. He was a candidate in the 2019–20 Confederation presidential primary.

References

External links
 https://konfederacja.net/prawybory/

Congress of the New Right politicians
Living people
Politicians from Kraków
Members of the Polish Sejm 2019–2023
1984 births